Kylo is a primarily masculine name usually given in reference to the Star Wars character Kylo Ren. Usage of the name has increased in the United States and United Kingdom and elsewhere. According to some sources, parents might have found the sound of the name attractive and find the character appealing despite his villainy.

Usage
The name has been among the 1,000 most common names for boys in the United States in 2016. In 2020, the year it was most popular, there were 659 newborn American boys given the name and the name was ranked in 449th position on the popularity chart. In 2021, the name was ranked in 526th position, with 555 American boys given the name. The name is also used occasionally for girls. Nine newborn American girls were given the name in 2021.

People
Kylo-Patrick Hart, a department chair at the Texas Christian University
Kylo Jones, a player for the Western Michigan Broncos men's basketball team
Kylo Evergreen Maris, the son of Bill Maris
Kylo Turner, a former singer for the Pilgrim Travelers

Fictional characters
Prince Kylo, a character in the Doctor Who universe
Kylo Ren, the main antagonist of the sequel trilogy of the Star Wars universe

References

English given names invented by fiction writers